Tamim Al-Barghouti is a Palestinian-Egyptian poet, columnist and political scientist. Nicknamed the "poet of Jerusalem", he is one of the most widely read poets in the Arab World.

Life 
Tamim al-Barghouti was born in Cairo in 1977. He is the son of Palestinian writer and poet Mourid al-Barghouti and the Egyptian writer, Radwa Ashour. Around the time of Tamim's birth, Egypt was in peace talks with Israel that led to the Camp David Accords in 1979. President Anwar Sadat then banished most prominent Palestinian figures from Egypt, including Tamim's father, Mourid al-Barghouti, when Tamim was five months old. He would go with his mother to visit his exiled father living in Budapest on vacations. Tamim cited his separation from his father as formational of his interest in political science.

His interest in literature began around the age of 12 or 13 with an abridged version of Abu al-Faraj al-Isfahani's Kitab al-Aghani. He then read a commentary on the Seven Long Mu'allaqat, Ibn Abd Rabbih's Al-ʿIqd al-Farīd and Al-Mubarrad's .

In his youth he also met and was influenced by figures such as Emile Habibi, Mahmoud Darwish, Saadi Youssef, Saadallah Wannous, Ahmed Fouad Negm, and Abdel Rahman el-Abnudi. Later on he associated with poets of a younger generation, including ,  and Ibn Amin Ahmed.

Tamim al-Barghouthi wrote his first poem, "Allah Yahdiha Falastīn" in colloquial Palestinian Arabic when he was 18 years old. He published his first diwan, or book of poetry, entitled Mijna—also in colloquial Palestinian Arabic—in 1999 when he was 22. His second poetry collection, entitled el-Munzir, was published the following year in Egyptian colloquial Arabic.

In 1999, Tamim al-Barghouthi earned a bachelor's degree in political science from the College of Economics and Political Science at Cairo University. He then earned a master's degree in politics and international relations from The American University in Cairo.

On the eve of the American invasion of Iraq in 2003, he left Egypt in protest of its position on the invasion. Between 2003 and 2004 he worked as a columnist at The Daily Star in Lebanon, writing on Arab culture, history, and identity. He has then worked for the United Nations at the Division for Palestinian Rights, the Department of Political and Peacebuilding Affairs, and in 2005 and 2006 at the UN Mission in Sudan.

He earned a Ph.D. in political science from Boston University in 2004.

He wrote two poems that garnered him popular and critical acclaim: the first was "'Kaluli: Bathab Masr?" ( "They Asked Me: Do you love Egypt?") written in Egyptian colloquial Arabic, and the second was "Maqām 'Iraq" ( "Maqam of Iraq") in Standard Arabic in 2005.

He taught political science as an assistant professor at the American University in Cairo. In 2007, he became a fellow at the Berlin Institute for Advanced Study. He also worked as a visiting professor at Free University of Berlin and Georgetown University in Washington DC.

In 2007, he wrote the critically acclaimed poem "Fi l-Qudsi" ( "In Jerusalem") for the Emirate television competition show Amir ash-Shu'arā' ( Prince of the Poets). “In Jerusalem and Other Poems" was his first book translated into English.

In February 2021, Tamim's father, renowned Palestinian poet Mourid Barghouti, died at the age of 76 in the Jordanian capital Amman, after spending most of his life in exile. Tamim wrote late on Sunday on his Facebook page: “May Allah have mercy on my mother and father”.

He has a series of short cultural videos on AJ+ in Arabic called Ma'a Tamim in which recites original poetry or discusses themes in literature, art, and history.

He delivered a poem at the closing ceremony of the 2022 FIFA World Cup in Qatar.

Selected works

Academic works

Poetry collections

References

External links
Articles by Tamim Al-Barghouti - Los Angeles Times
Georgetown University contact page
After Tunisia: Tamim Al-Barghouti on Palestine

1977 births
Living people
Cairo University alumni
Palestinian people of Egyptian descent
The American University in Cairo alumni
Boston University alumni
Academic staff of The American University in Cairo
Georgetown University faculty
20th-century Palestinian poets
Palestinian academics
21st-century Palestinian poets
Palestinian male poets
20th-century male writers
21st-century male writers